Epidendrum hololeucum is an epiphytic species of orchid that falls under the genus Epidendrum, from Brazil.  It is considered to be similar to E. caparaoense and E. geniculatum.

References 

hololeucum
Orchids of Brazil